Birger Stuevold-Hansen (14 August 1870 – 13 August 1933) was the Norwegian Minister of Trade from 1919 to 1920.

1870 births
1933 deaths
Ministers of Trade and Shipping of Norway